Guy L. Coté (1925 - 1994) was a Canadian filmmaker with the National Film Board of Canada. He was also founding president of the Canadian Federation of Film Societies, and co-founder of the Cinémathèque québécoise and the Montreal World Film Festival.

Early life
Guy Louis Coté was born in Ottawa in 1925, the eldest child of Louis Côté and Stella Cimon. His was a prominent family; his father was a Senator, his maternal grandfather was the politician and judge Ernest Cimon. After graduating from the University of Ottawa in 1944, he moved to Université Laval, graduating in 1947 with a B.Sc. in chemistry-physics. He also earned a Rhodes Scholarship and, from 1947 to 1952, attended Oxford University (St John's College), graduating with a B.A. (Hons) in chemistry.

While at Oxford, Coté developed his long-held interest in cinema. He wrote about film for the student newspaper Isis, eventually becoming its editor-in-chief. He became president of the Student Film Society, and sat on the committee of the Experimental Film Group (EFG). He wanted to make the Oxford Film Society the largest in the UK, and hoped to allocate more funds to the EFG, whose members were keen to become avant-garde filmmakers.

By 1951, he was captain of the Oxford Ski Team and was asked to make a film about the skiing competition between Oxford and Cambridge University which was to take place in Sestriere, Italy.  With a budget of £750, he produced Sestriere, a film of such quality that it was screened in Norway and Canada, and aired on French television. 

In 1952, the EFG was looking for a strong subject for a summer film. Fellow EFG member Sam Kaner proposed a ballet film. Resources were begged and borrowed; the result was the first film Coté directed, Between Two Worlds.

Career

In the course of raising funds to make the film, Coté had contacted the London office of the National Film Board of Canada (NFB). James Beveridge was in charge of that office at the time; by now, Coté had given up the idea of becoming a physics professor and, when he graduated in 1952 and was about to return to Canada, Beveridge recommended him to the board. He was hired in 1953, becoming one of the original members of Studio B. He directed his first film, Winter in Canada, and launched Canadian Newsreel, a newsletter for the hundreds of film clubs which had sprung up around the NFB series  Canada Carries On and Eye Witness. With Dorothy Burritt of the Toronto Film Society, he also founded the Canadian Federation of Film Societies. 

Coté was then sent back to England to run the NFB’s London office. He returned in 1955, just as the NFB was moving from Ottawa to Montreal. His filmmaking duties were light; he made one film in 1955, two in 1956 and none in 1957. Instead, he concentrated on archivism. Coté had been collecting cinematic material all of his life—film, posters, press clippings and books, writing in 1964 "It is interesting to collect books. But why make (a collection) like I did? Because it was necessary. I spent a fortune making this library. One day it will go...to a cinematheque”. 

Coté became involved with the Canadian Film Institute, the Professional Association of Filmmakers, the Knowledge of Cinema Foundation, the Canadian Film Club Federation and the Montreal International Film Festival. One of the festival’s founders was his boss at the NFB, Pierre Juneau, who placed him on the board. Much of his time through the late 1950s was spent on organizing the festival, which would launch in 1960 and end, due to in-fighting, ideological differences and politics, in 1967. 

In 1962, the Canadian Film Club Federation created a film education committee called "Cognizance du Cinéma". In 1964, it became the Museum of Canadian Cinema, or Cinémathèque Canadienne, with Coté as its president. In 1968, the majority of its board members voted to center the institution’s activities around the interests of Quebec and re-name it Cinémathèque Québécoise. Coté strongly opposed this and resigned. But he was contractually obligated to sell his archival collection to the Cinémathèque, which took possession of it in 1970. The collection became the Documentation Centre at the Cinémathèque Québécoise. The Documentation Centre is now the Médiathèque Guy-L.-Coté and is one of the largest film reference libraries in North America.

As part of Expo 67 celebrations, Coté organized the International Animation Film Exhibition, a retrospective of international animation cinema. In 1969, the NFB created Studio D for French-language production and Coté became its program manager and documentary producer. While this position only lasted one year, he was back in the same role from 1985 to 1987. During that time, commissioner François N. Macerola was developing a new five-year plan for the NFB; it was Coté who prepared detailed reports to defend production spending—he also proposed that the provincial governments pay for regional production and the head office pay for production of films on national issues. While others privately agreed with him, this was considered ‘heresy’ and the proposal was not accepted. 

In 1976, Coté co-organized a film festival for Montreal’s Week on Ageing, Age and Life, for which he created four films: Monsieur Journault, Blanche et Claire, Les vieux amis and Rose et Monsieur Charbonneau. In 1979, as part of the NFB’s 40th birthday celebrations, he created a trilogy on international cooperation: Marastoon: The Place Where One Is Helped (Afghanistan), Dominga (Bolivia), and Azzel (Niger).

Coté’s last films were a series of documentaries about the history of religion in Quebec culture which, with François Brault, Gilles Lenoir and Raymond Gauthier, he produced through 1987.

Personal life and death
Coté met and married Nancy McCallum in England in 1952; they had four children. In 1977, Guy and Nancy returned to school, going to night classes in Sociology at Concordia University before applying to the Master’s program at Oxford. Coté took a sabbatical from the NFB and they both earned their Master’s degrees in Sociology, graduating in 1982. Guy continued on, studying social mobility, and obtained his doctorate from Oxford in 1983, after which he lectured on sociology at the University of Montreal. In 1987, the NFB offered filmmakers early retirement packages; Coté retired and went to work for Statistics Canada, spending two years on a study of the social positions of occupations. 

In 1977, the Cotés bought a second home in Frelighsburg, in Quebec’s Eastern Townships. Coté became vice-president of the local historical society and wrote articles about the region for the newspaper La Voix de l'Est. (He was also Treasurer of the Champlain-Adirondack Biosphere Reserve and Vice-President of Parks and Natural Spaces for the Fondation de la faune du Québec.)
 
Near Frelighsburg is Mount Pinnacle, a pristine mountain favoured by hikers and nature-lovers. In 1987, the provincial government approved a plan to develop Mount Pinnacle into a ski and golf resort. To fight this,  Coté helped to mobilize the Association for the Conservation of Mount Pinnacle. The developer’s plan was ultimately unsuccessful and Mount Pinnacle is preserved, but the battle became so intense that the developer sued the association, the municipality and Coté, personally. 

In the spring of 1993, with the stress of the situation mounting, Coté and his wife traveled to Switzerland, where he suffered a heart attack. They spent seven months in Tourtour, on the French Riviera so Coté could recuperate, but they had to return to Quebec to prepare for the trial. In August 1994, Coté suffered a second heart attack, which left him in a coma. He died in Montreal on September 6th, at the age of 69.

Although Coté was fully-bilingual and a French-language producer, it is presumably because he was from Ontario that he was not awarded honours such as the Prix Albert-Tessier.

Filmography

Oxford University Film Society
Between Two Worlds 1951 - director
Sistrières 1951 – producer, director 

National Film Board of Canada
Winter in Canada - documentary short, 1953 – writer, director
Grain Handling in Canada - documentary short, 1955 - writer, director 
Tu enfanteras dans la joie – short film, Bernard Devlin 1956 - animator
Raw Material – short film, Bernard Devlin 1956 – co-editor with David Mayerovitch
Canada Carries On: Industrial Canada - documentary short, 1958 - editor, producer, director, co-writer with Gilbert Choquette
Railroaders - documentary short, 1958 - writer, editor, director 
Fishermen - documentary short, 1959 - writer, editor, director
Roughnecks: The Story of Oil Drillers - documentary short, 1960 - writer, editor, director 
Cattle Ranch - documentary short, 1961 – writer, editor, director 
Kindergarten - documentary short, 1962 - editor, director
Runner - documentary short, Don Owen 1962 – co-editor with Don Owen 
Lonely Boy - documentary short, 1962 – co-editor with John Spotton
 The Living Machine – documentary, Roman Kroitor 1962 – co-editor with Robert Russell
 The Persistent Seed - documentary short, Christopher Chapman 1964 – co-editor with Christopher Chapman
Toronto Jazz – documentary short, Don Owen 1964 – co-editor with Don Owen
An Essay on Science – documentary short, 1964 - director
Regards sur l'occultisme: Magie et miracles – documentary, 1965 – director, co-editor with Arthur Lipsett 
Regards sur l'occultisme (2e partie) - Science et esprits – documentary, 1965 – director, co-editor with Arthur Lipsett 
The Waterdevil – short film, Raymond Garceau 1966 – producer
Harvesting – documentary short, Arthur Lamothe 1966 – co-producer with Marcel Martin
Big Rock – feature, Raymond Garceau 1967 – producer
 Le règne du jour (The Times That Are) – documentary, Pierre Perrault 1967 – co-producer with Jacques Bobet
Twenty Million People - documentary short, Arnie Gelbart 1967 – editor
Chantal: en vrac – short film, Jacques Leduc 1967 – producer
Masque – documentary short, Jacques Kasma 1968 – producer
Les voitures d'eau (The River Schooners) – feature, Pierre Perrault 1968 – co-producer with Jacques Bobet
Nominingue... depuis qu'il existe – documentary, Jacques Leduc 1968 – producer
Beluga Days – documentary short, Michel Brault, Bernard Gosselin and Pierre Perrault 1968 – co-producer with Jacques Bobet
Mother-To-Be – documentary, Anne Claire Poirier 1969 – producer
Éloge du chiac – documentary short, Michel Brault 1969 – producer
Là ou Ailleurs – documentary short, Jacques Leduc and Pierre Bernier 1969 – producer
A Total Service – documentary short, Arnie Gelbart and Jacques Leduc 1969 – co-producer with Marc Beaudet
Where Are You? – feature, Gilles Groulx 1969 – producer
Wake up, mes bons amis - documentary, Pierre Perrault 1970 – co-producer with Paul Larose and Tom Daly
On est au coton - documentary, Denys Arcand 1970 – co-producer with Marc Beaudet and Pierre Maheu
Acadia, Acadia?!? – documentary, Michel Brault and Pierre Perrault 1971 – co-producer with Paul Larose
Tranquillement, pas vite – documentary, 1972 – editor, director 
Both Sides of the Coin – documentary, 1974 – editor, director 
Monsieur Journault – documentary, 1976 – director
Blanche et Claire – documentary, 1976 - director 
Les vieux amis – documentary, 1976 - director
Rose et Monsieur Charbonneau – documentary, 1976 – editor, director
Marastoon: The Place Where One Is Helped – documentary short, 1979 – director 
Azzel – documentary short, 1979 – director
Dominga – documentary short, 1979 – director 
Le Combat d'Onésime Tremblay – documentary, Jean-Thomas Bédard 1985 – co-producer with Jean Dansereau
MenoTango – documentary short, Sylvie Van Brabant 1986 – co-executive producer with Raymond Gauthier
J'ai pas dit mon dernier mot – documentary, Yvon Provost 1986 – co-producer with Jean Dansereau
Discussions in Bioethics: The Old Woman – documentary short, Gilles Blais 1986 – producer
L'Amour en famille – documentary, Francine Prévost 1986 – co-producer with Jean Dansereau
Nuageux avec éclaircies – documentary, Sylvie Van Brabant 1986 – co-producer with Jean Dansereau and Raymond Gauthier
Dom Bellot, architecte, 1876-1943 – documentary short, François Brault 1986 – co-producer with Gilles Lenoir and Raymond Gauthier
Les Anges dans l'art au Québec – documentary short, François Brault 1986 – co-producer with Gilles Lenoir and Raymond Gauthier
Calvaires et Croix de chemin – documentary short, François Brault 1986 – co-producer with Gilles Lenoir and Raymond Gauthier
Les Chemins de croix au Québec – documentary short, François Brault 1986 – co-producer with Gilles Lenoir and Raymond Gauthier
Les Églises protestantes au Québec – documentary short, François Brault 1987 – co-producer with Gilles Lenoir and Raymond Gauthier
Louis Jobin, sculpteur, 1845-1928 – documentary short, François Brault 1987 – co-producer with Gilles Lenoir and Raymond Gauthier
Louis-Amable Quévillon, sculpteur et ornemaniste, 1749-1823 – documentary short, François Brault 1987 – co-producer with Gilles Lenoir and Raymond Gauthier
Napoléon Bourassa (1827-1916) et la décoration d'églises – documentary short, François Brault 1987 – co-producer with Gilles Lenoir and Raymond Gauthier
Thomas Baillairgé, architecte, 1791-1859 – documentary short, François Brault 1987 – co-producer with Gilles Lenoir and Raymond Gauthier
La Peinture en Nouvelle-France – documentary short, François Brault 1987 – co-producer with Gilles Lenoir and Raymond Gauthier
La Statuaire de cire – documentary short, François Brault 1987 – co-producer with Gilles Lenoir and Raymond Gauthier
Un trésor de la peinture sacrée au Québec: la collection des abbés Desjardins – documentary short, François Brault 1987 – co-producer with Gilles Lenoir and Raymond Gauthier

Awards
Fishermen (1959) 
South African International Film Festival, Bloemfontein:  First Prize, Documentary, 1960
 International Agricultural Film Competition, Berlin: Third Prize - Bronze Ear of Grain, 1960
 Columbus International Film & Animation Festival, Columbus, Ohio: Chris Certificate, 1960

Roughnecks: The Story of Oil Drillers (1960) 
 San Sebastián International Film Festival, San Sebastián: First Prize, 1960
 Golden Gate International Film Festival, San Francisco: Silver Plaque for Best Industrial Film, 1960
 International Industrial Film Festival, Torino: First Prize in Category, 1961
 Columbus International Film & Animation Festival, Columbus, Ohio: Chris Certificate, Business and Industry, General Information for Public, 1961
 Yorkton Film Festival, Yorkton: First Prize, Industry and Agriculture, 1962
 HEMISFILM, San Antonio TX: Best Film, 1972

Cattle Ranch (1961)
 Locarno Film Festival, Locarno: Diploma of Honour, 1961
 Vancouver International Film Festival, Vancouver: Honourable Mention, Science and Agriculture, 1961
 International Festival of Films for Television, Rome: First Prize, Gold Plaque, Documentary, 1963
 Congrès du spectacle, Montreal: Best Documentary, 1966

Kindergarten (1962) 
 International Filmfestival Mannheim-Heidelberg, Mannheim: Special Mention of the International Jury, 1963
 International Educational Film Festival, Tehran: Bronze Delfan, Third Prize, Educational Films, 1964

An Essay on Science (1964) 
 International Industrial Film Festival, London: Third Prize, General Information, 1964
 Australian and New Zealand Association for the Advancement of Science (ANZAAS), Sydney: Special Mention, 1964
 International Exhibition of Scientific Film, Buenos Aires: Diploma of Honor, 1966

Chantal: en vrac (1967) 
 Montreal International Film Festival, Montreal: First Prize, medium-length films, 1967

Acadia Acadia?!? (1971) 
 Festival international du film d'expression française, Dinard, France: L'Émeraude de Dinard - Festival's Grand Prize, 1971

Discussions in Bioethics: The Old Woman (1986) 
 Festival Québécois de l'audiovisuel, Montreal: Certificate of Merit, Government Film, 1987

J'ai pas dit mon dernier mot (1986) 
 Rendez-vous Québec Cinéma, Montreal: Special mention of the Quebec Association of Film Critics, 1987

References

1925 births
1994 deaths
National Film Board of Canada people
Film directors from Ottawa
Film producers from Ontario
French-language film directors
film festival directors
Film archives
Film archivists